Benjamin Henry Paddock (February 29, 1828 – March 9, 1891) was the fifth Bishop of Massachusetts in the Episcopal Church.

Biography
Paddock was born on February 29, 1828, in Norwich, Connecticut, the son of the Reverend Seth Birdsey Paddock who was rector of Trinity Church in Norwich, and Emily Flagg. He studied at Trinity College and graduated in 1848. After graduation, he served as a teacher at the Episcopal Academy of Connecticut for one year. He then enrolled at the General Theological Seminary and graduated with a Bachelor of Divinity in 1852.

Paddock was ordained deacon on June 29, 1852 by Bishop Thomas Church Brownell of Connecticut in Christ Church, Stamford, Connecticut, and priest on September 27, 1853 by John Williams in Trinity Church, Norwich, Connecticut. Initially he served as assistant minister at the Church of the Epiphany in New York City. In 1853 he became rector of St Luke’s Church in Portland, Maine, however after three months resigned and returned to Norwich, Connecticut, to serve as rector of Trinity Church. In 1860 he became rector of Christ Church Detroit, and in 1869 became rector of Grace Church in Brooklyn, New York City.

In 1873, Paddock was elected Bishop of Massachusetts and was consecrated on September 17, 1873 by Presiding Bishop Benjamin B. Smith. He retained the post till his death in 1891.

See also

 List of bishops of the Episcopal Church in the United States of America

References

1828 births
1891 deaths
Religious leaders from Norwich, Connecticut
General Theological Seminary alumni
19th-century American Episcopalians
Episcopal bishops of Massachusetts
19th-century American clergy